Phan Đức Lễ (born 17 October 1993) is a Vietnamese footballer who plays as a defender for V.League 1 club Hoang Anh Gia Lai.

References 

1993 births
Living people
Vietnamese footballers
Association football defenders
V.League 1 players
SHB Da Nang FC players
Long An FC players
People from Gia Lai Province